Soumya Ranjan Patnaik (born 18 August 1952) is an Indian politician and the founder-editor of the Odia daily Sambad. He is also a feature film producer as well as a successful business personality. He was elected to 11th Lok Sabha from Bhubaneswar (Lok Sabha constituency) on Indian National Congress ticket. After he was expelled from Congress he floated a new political party 'Aama Odisha Party' (AOP). He is married to Sudatta Patnaik, daughter of Janaki Ballabh Patnaik and Jayanti Patnaik.

On 6 Mar 2018 he merged Aama Odisha Party into Biju Janata Dal and the very same day he was nominated by Naveen Patnaik as a Biju Janata Dal MP of Rajya Sabha. Shri Soumya Ranjan Patnaik is a member of 16th Assembly of Odisha (2019–2024) elected from Khandapada assembly constituency.

Filmography

References

External links

1952 births
Living people
India MPs 1996–1997
Lok Sabha members from Odisha
People from Kendujhar district
Politicians from Bhubaneswar
Biju Janata Dal politicians
Bharatiya Janata Party politicians from Odisha
Indian National Congress politicians from Odisha
Odisha MLAs 2019–2024